Saint Andrew's Episcopal School is an independent co-educational day school, which teaches pre-kindergarten to grade eight in Saratoga, Santa Clara County, California.

Although affiliated with the Episcopal Church, Saint Andrews's welcomes students of all beliefs and includes teaching about all major faiths. It was founded in 1961, as a ministry of Saint Andrew's Episcopal Church, in the Episcopal Diocese of El Camino Real.  The school is organized into two divisions: the Lower School (pre-kindergarten–5th grade) and the Middle School (grades 6–8).

The California Association of Independent Schools accredits the school. Saint Andrew's Episcopal School is also a member of the National Association of Episcopal Schools and the National Association of Independent Schools (NAIS).

, 390 students are enrolled, and the average class size is 16. Khadija A. Fredericks is the Head of School.

Saint Andrew's describes itself as a wholehearted community of learners with a wholehearted commitment to cultivating student happiness, academic achievement, and character. Our complete, balanced, and inspiring approach to education ensures that our graduates are exceptionally good people who are exceptionally well-prepared to thrive in high school, college, and life.

Courses
In Lower School (PK - 5), the small class sizes allow for individualized attention in the core subjects lead by the primary homeroom teacher. Lab time for science is scheduled 1-2 per week. Students also have art, music, physical education, religion, Spanish, technology and, library each week with specialist instructors.

In Middle School, students have the core classes of Math, English, Science, Social Studies, and Spanish, as well as specialist classes that include art, music, religion, physical education, and technology. Starting in middle school, two levels of Math are offered, with the regular level culminating in Algebra and the advanced level culminating in Geometry.

Character
Saint Andrew's believes character education is a fundamental piece of the Pre-Kindergarten through grade eight education experience. It is during these formative years that children embrace and develop the core values, or skills for life, they will need throughout their teen and adult years. Good character is modeled, discussed, and taught during advisories, in the classroom, in chapel, and all around campus. The  Six Pillars of Character (Trustworthiness, Respect, Responsibility, Fairness, Caring, Citizenship) serve as the school's character education curriculum.

Technology
Technology is integrated throughout the school curriculum. The school features a 1:1 iPad program. Each student is assigned a unique email address that is part of a closed network.

Athletics
Saint Andrew's is a member of the Diocese of San Jose Catholic Athletic League - Central Division. The school supports Cross-Country and Track, boys and girls Basketball, boys and girls Volleyball, and boys and girls Flag Football. Additionally, the school's Physical Education program exposes children to multiple types of sports. In the PE course, each week students in grades 6-8 participate in the unique Race Across the Country Program.

Music
The school has an extensive Music program. Two concerts, one in the winter and one in the spring, are given every year, and all students take part. The instruments generally center around the xylophone, but musicians who play other instruments are encouraged to join as well. In addition to the standard enrichment class, optional programs are available. These include the Concert Choir, Jazz Choir, Jazz Band, Concert Band, Beginners' Band, Rock Band, and more, depending on the interest of students.

Saint Andrew's attends the annual WorldStrides Heritage Festivals held in Anaheim, CA. Saint Andrew's is consistently ranked high in the competition, winning Gold awards nearly every year.

Religion
Saint Andrew's is, as the full name states, an Episcopal school. Chapel is held on Tuesday, Wednesday, and Thursday: Tuesday chapel is exclusively for members of the Lower School, Wednesday's service is for Middle School, and Thursday is for the entire school. Eucharist is held at the first chapel of each month. A Religion class is also held; for 6th grade, it centers around the branches of Christianity, for 7th grade, it centers around teachings of different world religions, including lectures from guest speakers and field trips, and for 8th grade, it is an ethics class.

High School Selection and Matriculation
Students begin investigating and shadowing at high schools as early as seventh grade. During eighth grade, students participate in a variety of activities that prepare them for the rigorous high school application process including mock interviews, application essay writing and guides for effective shadow experiences. High schools regularly send representatives to talk to Saint Andrew's students about various high schools. These lectures are an optional visit for 7th graders, but mandatory for 8th graders. A day in October is reserved as a "High School Retreat", where 8th graders spend the entire school day writing/editing résumés and application essays, and preparing for interviews.

For more than 50 years Saint Andrew's Episcopal School has seen 90% or greater of the matriculating 8th grade students accepted to top Catholic and Independent Schools. While most students stay in the area, Saint Andrew's graduates have been accepted to top high schools across the country and internationally as well.

Recent graduates have matriculated to:
Archbishop Mitty High School, Bellarmine College Preparatory, Castilleja School, Harker School, National Cathedral - Washington, DC, Notre Dame - San Jose, Presentation High School, Sacred Heart Prep, Saint Francis High School, Saratoga High School, Los Gatos High School, Thacher School, Woodside Priory

References

External links
Official web site of school

Educational institutions established in 1961
Private elementary schools in California
Private middle schools in California
Saratoga, California
Education in Santa Clara County, California
1961 establishments in California
Episcopal schools in the United States